Leberknödel is a traditional dish of German, Austrian and Czech cuisines.

Leberknödel are usually composed of beef liver, though in the German Palatinate region pork is used as an alternative. The meat is ground and mixed with bread, eggs, parsley and various spices, often nutmeg or marjoram. In Austria spleen is often mixed with the liver in a 1/3 ratio. 

Using 2 moistened tablespoons, the batter is formed into dumplings and boiled in beef broth or fried in lard.

Due to their looser consistency, the boiled dumplings are meant to be eaten fresh after preparation, although the fried variant are somewhat less perishable due to the crust formed by frying.

In the Palatinate, Leberknödel are often served with sauerkraut and mashed potatoes. In Bavaria and Austria they are usually served in soup as Leberknödelsuppe (Liver dumpling soup).

See also
Knödel
Bavarian cuisine
 List of meatball dishes

References

Meatballs
Austrian cuisine
Bavarian cuisine
Czech cuisine
German cuisine